Ophthalmitis cordularioides is a moth in the family Geometridae first described by Jeremy Daniel Holloway in 1993. It is found in Borneo and Sumatra.

The wingspan is 27–30 mm for males and about 33 mm for females. In facies this species resembles closely Ophthalmitis cordularia from the Himalayas and Ophthalmitis rufilauta but with black rather than brown markings.

External links

Boarmiini
Moths of Borneo
Moths described in 1993